Liman may refer to:

Places
Liman, Azerbaijan, a city in Lankaran Rayon
Liman, Davachi, a village in Shabran Rayon, Azerbaijan
Liman, Israel, a moshav in northern Israel
Liman, Russia, name of several inhabited localities in Russia
Liman, Novi Sad, a quarter of the city Novi Sad, Serbia

 Lyman, Ukraine, a city in Ukraine.

People
Abubakar Liman (born 1964), Nigerian air vice-marshal
Arthur L. Liman (1932-1997), American lawyer
Blessing Liman (born 1984), Nigerian military pilot
Doug Liman (born 1965), American film director and producer
Ibrahim Alhaji Liman (born 1960s), Controller General of Fire Service of Nigeria
Lewis J. Liman (born 1960), American judge
Mohammed Tukur Liman (active from 1999), Nigerian politician
Muhammad Sanusi Liman (born ), Nigerian physicist
Rosli Liman (born 1969), Bruneian footballer
Liman Ibrahim (active from 2013), Nigerian member of Boku Haram
Otto Liman von Sanders, German general

Other
Liman Substage, a subdivision of the Illinoian Stage in geochronology
Liman (landform), a type of lagoon or estuary, most prominent on the coast of the Black Sea
Liman irrigation system, a system of collecting runoff water to sustain small tree groves in deserts
Treaty of Balta Liman, a commercial treaty signed in 1838 between the Ottoman Empire and the United Kingdom
Russian ship Liman, an intelligence ship sunk in 2017

See also